is a Japanese footballer. He is a defender whose primary position is a left back, who can also play as a centre back.

Career
Having previously played for Kyoto Sanga U-18 and Ritsumeikan University, Yamada to sign for Albirex Niigata FC (Singapore) for the upcoming S.League campaign. His consistent performance has rewarded him with a contract extension for the 2014 S.League season.

After three years in Singapore and brief experiences between Laos and Thailand, Yamada came back to Japan, joining Blaublitz Akita in April 2017.

Club career statistics
As of 22 August 2018.

Honours
 Blaublitz Akita
 J3 League (1): 2017

References

External links

Profile at J. League
Profile at Blaublitz Akita

1990 births
Living people
Japanese footballers
Singapore Premier League players
J3 League players
Albirex Niigata Singapore FC players
Blaublitz Akita players
Association football defenders